Khaled Meddah (born 4 March 1978) is an Algerian judoka.

Achievements

References

1978 births
Living people
Algerian male judoka
Judoka at the 2000 Summer Olympics
Judoka at the 2004 Summer Olympics
Olympic judoka of Algeria
Mediterranean Games silver medalists for Algeria
Mediterranean Games medalists in judo
Competitors at the 2001 Mediterranean Games
African Games medalists in judo
African Games bronze medalists for Algeria
Competitors at the 1999 All-Africa Games
21st-century Algerian people
20th-century Algerian people